Tadeusz Franciszek Semik was a Polish lieutenant colonel of the Polish Armed Forces who was most notable during his service in World War II.

Biography
Having completed the middle and a high school diploma, Semik volunteered for the Polish Army on November 3, 1918, where was assigned to 12th Infantry Regiment in Wadowicach. Together with this unit, he fought in the Polish-Soviet War.

After the end of the war, he entered the Infantry Cadet School in Warsaw, which he graduated on July 1, 1921, and as a second lieutenant, he was assigned to the 2nd Legions' Infantry Regiment, in which he served in the years 1921-1927 as a platoon commander, and then a company commander.

Then, in the years 1927–1931, he served in the maneuvering battalion of the Infantry Training Center in Rembertów, 17th Infantry Regiment in Rzeszów, from 1931 to November 12, 1935. On February 22, 1934, he was appointed to the rank of captain with the seniority of January 1, 1934 and the 71st position in the corps of infantry officers. Later, he served in the KOP "Czortków" battalion as the commander of the 1st machine gun company until August 1939. He completed the battalion commanders' course on August 25, 1939, and was assigned to the 1st Mountain Brigade, whose task was to cover the Kraków Army eastern wing.

On August 28, 1939, he formed and took command of 151 "Węgierska Górka" fortress company . At its head, during the Invasion of Poland, he fought at Węgierska Górka. He then received incredible courage and the ability to use his shooting talent. Due to inability to resist further, deprived of communication and outside help, he surrendered the position to the overwhelming German forces. Semik was heavily wounded on September 3, he was captured, where he spent the rest of the war. He stayed in the XA Itzehoe, XC Lubeck and the Oflag II-C camps.

After his release, January 25, 1945, by the Red Army, Semik returned to Polish on May 1, 1945, and volunteered for the Polish People's Army, where he was assigned to the 46 Infantry Regiment 13 Infantry Division in Katowice, the commander of the battalion. On November 15, 1945, he became the commander of the 48th Section Headquarters in Prudnik, and then for several years as a major he performed many functions in the Katowice Department of WOP No. 10 . In 1948 he was transferred to the reserve. In 1964, in recognition of his merits, he was promoted to the rank of lieutenant colonel. He died on November 27, 1978, in Sucha Beskidzka and was buried there.

Awards
Virtuti Militari, Silver Cross
Cross of Merit, Gold Cross
Cross of Merit, Silver Cross — 1938 "for merits in the service of border protection"
Medal of Victory and Freedom 1945
Medal of the Decade of Regained Independence
Commemorative Medal for the War of 1918-1921
Wound Decoration

References

1889 births
1978 deaths
Polish people of the Polish–Soviet War
Polish military personnel of World War II
People from Prudnik
Recipients of the Silver Cross of the Virtuti Militari